The University of Wisconsin Dairy Barn is a building located on the campus of the University of Wisconsin–Madison. Built in 1897, the building played an important role in the field of dairy science during the 20th century. It has been used both as a teaching facility and as a site for agricultural research. It is significant for its association with the single-grain experiment, performed from 1907 to 1911 by Stephen Babcock. The UW Dairy Barn was declared a National Historic Landmark in 2005.

Architecture
The Dairy Barn is a complex of six attached buildings. A trio of buildings is attached at the rear (south): a  young livestock barn on the west, a  classroom and stock judging area in the center, and a  cow barn on the east. Also attached to the barn is a  litter shed, a  milk shed, and a  livestock barn. Tracks from the Chicago, Milwaukee, St. Paul and Pacific Railroad run just to the south of the complex.

History
The University of Wisconsin College of Agriculture was founded in 1889. Founding dean William Arnon Henry moved the program from South Hall onto its own, four-building campus. Henry became a leading researcher and writer on feeding livestock, especially after the 1898 publication of his Feeds and Feeding. Stephen Moulton Babcock, the department chair of agricultural chemistry, convinced Henry to build a station to study cattle feeding. Initially, Henry refused because he did not believe a chemist could appropriately study the field. Babcock continued to petition the university for the building and finally animal husbandman W. L. Carlyle agreed in 1897.

Carlyle and Babcock set up an experiment testing if salt was required in a dairy cow's diet. When one of their eight salt-deprived cows died, the experiment was halted. In 1901, Henry consented to allow Babcock to oversee an experiment comparing feed types, though he limited it to two animals and the experiment had inconclusive results. In 1907, after establishing a long-term testing plan, Babcock started the single-grain experiment. Cattle received rations from a single plant, though they were balanced so that each animal received sufficient nutrients. By the time the experiment ended in 1911, it was clear that the corn-fed group was significantly healthier than those fed oats, wheat, or a mixture of the three. The study was published that June and catalyzed the international study of nutrition.

Other important studies conducted in the barn complex was the selective breeding experiment of the early 20th century, artificial insemination projects in the 1930s, and gonadotropic hormone studies in the 1940s.

See also
List of National Historic Landmarks in Wisconsin
National Register of Historic Places listings in Madison, Wisconsin

References

External links
University of Wisconsin Dairy Barn, Wisconsin State Historical Society
Dairy Barn in The Buildings of the University of Wisconsin

Barns on the National Register of Historic Places in Wisconsin
Buildings and structures in Madison, Wisconsin
Infrastructure completed in 1897
National Historic Landmarks in Wisconsin
University and college buildings on the National Register of Historic Places in Wisconsin
Dairy Barn
National Register of Historic Places in Madison, Wisconsin
Experimental farms in the United States
Wisconsin dairy barns
Research institutes in Wisconsin